Dudi Sela and Amir Weintraub were the defending champions but chose not to defend their title.

Jonathan Eysseric and Sergiy Stakhovsky won the title after defeating Stefan Kozlov and Akira Santillan 6–4, 7–6(7–4) in the final.

Seeds

Draw

References
 Main Draw

Ningbo Challenger - Doubles